Molly K. MaCauley (1957 - 2016) was an economist specializing in satellites and the United States' space program, and vice president for research at Resources for the Future, a Washington-based think tank. She was murdered by stabbing in 2016. She began her career in Space Policy and Space Economics at Resources for the Future, an economic and environmental policy think tank in Washington, DC.  She dedicated 35 years of her life building a novel field of analysis with interesting perspectives on the dynamics of space, its regulation, its protection, and its service to humanity.  At the time of her death, she was the vice president for research at Resources for the Future.

References

External links

American economists
1957 births
2016 deaths
People from Baltimore
Resources for the Future